H. G. Wells' War of the Worlds, also known as Invasion and H. G. Wells' The Worlds in War internationally, or simply as War of the Worlds, is a 2005 American direct-to-DVD science fiction war film produced by The Asylum and directed by David Michael Latt. It is a loose adaptation of the H. G. Wells novel, and a mockbuster of the DreamWorks/Paramount film based on the same source, in addition to the third film adaptation overall.

A contemporary translation of the novel set in the United States, War of the Worlds tells of an invasion of Earth by technologically-advanced extraterrestrials, from the perspective of an American astronomer trying to reunite with his family. It is the only adaptation besides the 1953 film in which the main character actively tries to repel the aliens. The film is loosely based on an unproduced screenplay called "Invasion", written by Carlos De Los Rios in 1997.

The DVD was released on June 28, one day before DreamWorks' film, and stars C. Thomas Howell, Peter Greene, and Jake Busey. The alternate title of Invasion is likely for the film's overseas distribution since Paramount Pictures claims to own exclusive film rights of the War of the Worlds title in the European Union, but also derives from the original name of De Los Rios's screenplay. The film is The Asylum's most successful production to date, having sold over 250,000 copies from Blockbuster upon its release.  A sequel, War of the Worlds 2: The Next Wave, was released in 2008.

Plot
On the surface of Mars, the Mars rover is destroyed by an unknown force. Astronomer George Herbert (Howell) and his wife Felicity (Van Wyk Loots) are packing for a trip to Washington, D.C. to celebrate their 10th wedding anniversary. George's son Alex spots a meteorite entering Earth's atmosphere. George is called to work about the incident, and his wife and son leave early for D.C. without him. As he drives to work, a meteorite lands. An alien "walker" emerges from the crater and massacres the witnesses with an energy weapon, George barely escaping with his life. George decides to meet with his brother Matt in Hopewell before moving on to Washington, D.C..

Despite rumors that D.C. has suffered some of the worst of the invasion thus far, George moves onward and meets with Sgt. Kerry Williams, the last remaining member of his squad. George and Williams meet with Samuelson, a power-mad Lieutenant with unrealistic notions of resistance against the invaders, who rejects them as cowards. In Hopewell, the walkers launch a heavy insurrection and Matt dies in the trail of destruction. George and Williams are separated in the battle. A pastor, Victor, finds George and describes his belief that the invasion is a form of the Rapture, but remains optimistic. The two go on together towards D.C.. Victor's faith is bruised when a hysterical member of his church curses God for the death of her children. George and Victor witness the final effort of the military against the walkers, who defeat them with toxic gas.

The two seek refuge in the abandoned house of a veterinarian for food and medicine when the neighborhood is flattened by another meteorite, trapping them in the ruins. George observes the aliens harvesting humans while Victor becomes despondent, rejecting his faith. George finds rabies vaccines and plans to use it against the aliens. George successfully injects a curious alien, only for it to kill Victor and leave. Days later, the aliens vanish and George continues his journey on foot to D.C.. George reunites with Williams and a deranged Samuelson, who has given himself a battlefield promotion. Samuelson senselessly murders Williams, and George in turn murders Samuelson.

George finally reaches D.C., which is completely destroyed. George becomes suicidal until he finds that the aliens have all died, having no immunity to a human virus. George finds Felicity and Alex alive among the few human survivors.

Cast
 C. Thomas Howell as Dr. George Herbert
 Andy Lauer as Sgt. Kerry Williams
 Rhett Giles as Pastor Victor
 Tinarie Van Wyk-Loots as Felicity Herbert
 Jake Busey as Lt./General Samuelson
 Peter Greene as Matt Herbert
 Dashiell Howell as Alex Herbert
 Edward DeRuiter as Max

Adapting the novel
Director/editor/executive producer/co-writer David Michael Latt (who admits to never seeing the Byron Haskin/George Pal version or the 1988 television series, but has been a fan of the H.G. Wells novel since childhood) made it clear that his film changed certain aspects from the source material in addition to the time and location. Most notable is that the tripods have been changed to six-legged crab-like machines called "walkers" (a result of allowing the effects team creative freedom).

The aliens are indeed Martians (though the film never states this, it is suggested as an opening credit sequence uses shots of the Red Planet's landscape), but they bear little resemblance to their novel's counterparts. Whereas Wells described his invaders as bear-sized tentacled creatures, the film's Martians are insect-like with four tentacle-like legs. These aliens also have the ability to spit acid from their feet, which melts anything. At the end of the legs three tongue-like appendages closely resemble the Martian fingers from Byron Haskin's 1953 film version of The War of the Worlds and the 1988 television series version.

The war machines are crab-like "walkers" with six legs. A Heat Ray is built into the machine's "head", and is fired from a single eye. The fighting machines do not appear to have protection against modern artillery (avoiding the "invisible shields" seen in the 1953 film version and Steven Spielberg's 2005 film), leaving their ability to conquer unexplained. The aliens do have a substance similar to the black smoke, but is more of a dense green toxic gas unable to rise above ground level, allowing survivors to escape by getting to high places.

The protagonist is George Herbert, a reference to H. G. Wells. Rather than being a writer, as in the novel, he is an astronomer. The film leaves the eve of the war storyline and its characters almost completely absent. He also has a son, who is portrayed by Dashiell Howell, who is actually the son of George's actor C. Thomas Howell.

Despite these differences, George goes through much of what befalls the novel's protagonist, even in sacrificing himself to the Martians, only for them to drop dead of infection. He is also separated from his family and tries to reunite with them once the invasion begins, As in the novel, they are alive at the conclusion. George's brother, a Ranger, is less fortunate; he is seen only briefly after being fatally wounded in an attack by the invaders. In the book, the narrator's brother takes up a major narrative role.

A major deviation from the text is that the protagonist actually tries to produce a means of stopping the Martians, but whether or not he is directly responsible for their downfall is ambiguous. There is a theme of disease throughout - George's son is seen suffering from a mild cold, while George himself suffers from a major fever which leaves him incapacitated for two days.

The novel's Artilleryman is divided into two characters. The first, Kerry Williams, exhibits the defeated status. He accompanies George as they move to unaffected areas, meeting soldiers oblivious to the danger they will soon face, until they become separated when George takes refuge underwater to evade the Martians. After his ordeal in the ruined house, George encounters the same defeatist Williams again. Instead, the other personality, portrayed in the novel's later stages, is Lt. Samuelson.

The novel's unnamed Curate is Victor in the film. While the two are very similar, Victor, a priest, is optimistic and is sure that the invasion is the Rapture. However, his faith is deeply shaken when he meets a congregant who screams against God for the loss of her family, causing Victor to question why he himself has yet to be taken. Unlike the Curate, Victor keeps his composure when he is trapped in the ruined house as he wrestles with his thoughts. Where the Curate had to be subdued in the novel, Victor regains his faith just before he is killed by the Martians.

The film includes homages to the 1953 film. The aliens' hands deliberately resemble those of the Martians of the 1953 film, and the protagonists of each film both actively try to weaken the aliens, another deviation from the novel.

Reception
Felix Vasquez Jr. of Cinema Crazed wrote: "It really says something that it took three writers to produce such a piece of junk." Everything Action states that the movie generally follows the outline of Wells' book, but found that the movie is not worth watching as it tries too hard to be taken seriously.

Scott Weinberg of DVDTalk.com gave it 3 out of 5 and wrote: "As direct-to-video sci-fi goes, this particular War of the Worlds version is a perfectly entertaining little diversion. If you just love the Alien Invasion stories, you could certainly do a whole lot worse. In fact, you probably have within the past year alone."

Sequel

On April 1, 2008, a sequel, War of the Worlds 2: The Next Wave, was released. C. Thomas Howell directed the film and reprised the role of George Herbert, and his son Dash Howell reprised the role of Alex. The film also starred Christopher Reid.

See also
 War of the Worlds, Steven Spielberg's 2005 blockbuster which is also a contemporary adaptation of H. G. Wells' novel.
 H.G. Wells' The War of the Worlds, a more faithful, lower-budget film adaptation of the novel.
 The Day the Earth Stopped, another Asylum film starring C. Thomas Howell that features an invasion by extraterrestrials.
 List of works based on The War of the Worlds

References

External links
 
 

2005 independent films
2000s science fiction horror films
2005 films
Alien invasions in films
American science fiction war films
The Asylum films
Mockbuster films
Direct-to-video science fiction films
Films based on British novels
Films based on The War of the Worlds
Films set in Washington, D.C.
Films directed by David Michael Latt
2000s English-language films
2000s American films